The governor of Rajasthan is the nominal head of state and the representative of the president of India of the state of Rajasthan. The governor's powers are mostly ceremonial and the executive powers of the governor are exercised by the chief minister of Rajasthan, who is the head of the executive of the state government of Rajasthan. The following is a list of governors of Rajasthan.

The incumbent, Kalraj Mishra, has served as the governor of Rajasthan since 9 September 2019.

Governors of Rajasthan

Notes

External links
 

R
Governors